David Shakow (1901–1981) was an American psychologist. He is perhaps best known for his development of the Scientist-Practitioner Model (or Boulder Model) of graduate training for clinical psychologists, adopted by the American Psychological Association in 1949.

He also did pioneering research in schizophrenia, especially focusing on how deterioration and deficit results in the loss of normal functioning. His work helped to humanize those with schizophrenia, which was then seen largely as dangerous and untreatable. He is also known in the field for creating one of the first U.S. clinical psychology internship programs while he was at Worcester State Hospital.

Biography

Early life and education 

David Shakow was born in New York City on January 2, 1901, to his father Abraham Chaikowitz (changed to Shakow upon his arrival to the U.S.), and his mother Eva Leventhal. Abraham and Eva Shakow immigrated from Russia to Manhattan's Lower East Side where they raised their Jewish - based family. During adolescence, Shakow strayed from Jewish tradition and deterred from a career in business. During this time, he was introduced to the Madison House. The Madison House is a settlement for immigrants that is well known for encouraging education in those who spend time there. His stay at the Madison House introduced him to influences such as Freud, Jung, and James, which inspired Shakow's interest in psychopathology. He began his college education at Harvard University, where he received both his bachelor's degree and then master's degree in science. He then began his dissertation in the quest for a doctorate degree, but after marrying his wife Sophie and beginning a family, decided to begin work at Worcester State Hospital in 1926. He later finished his doctorate degree with a main focus on schizophrenia, which sparked his interest in his work at Worcester.

Career 

In his time at Worcester State Hospital, he began one of the first clinical psychology internship programs. Shakow earned the position of chief psychologist as well as director of psychological research at the state hospital. It is here that he researched and wrote about the scientist-practitioner model. In 1948, he accepted a position as a psychology professor at the University of Illinois in the College of Medicine, and also did additional work at the University of Chicago in the Department of Psychology, where he taught for several years before moving on to a career in research. Shakow influenced the creation of NIMH Laboratory of Psychology where he was granted the position of chief in 1954. Here he focused on research and continued on to oversee over 500 articles. Shakow retired in 1966, but remained on staff as a senior research psychologist to conduct more research, articles, and memoirs, until he died of a heart attack at 80 years old in February 1981. He was survived by his wife, three children, and nine grandchildren.

Major contributions

The Scientist-Practitioner Model 

David Shakow was chief psychologist at the Worcester State Hospital, as well as a member of the Committee on the Training of Clinical Psychologists. His extensive schizophrenia research at the Worcester State Hospital helped him to develop what we know as the Boulder Model, or the Scientist-Practitioner Model. It aims to guide students in graduate programs to develop a foundation of research methodology, field work, and scientific practice through engagement to shape and improve their future work in the field of clinical psychology. This remains today to be the prominent model of training for clinical psychologists. Through this training and clinical experience, future mental health professionals would also have the chance to develop the understanding of the synergy between research and clinical practice as well as develop what Shakow coined "therapeutic attitude". He described this idea of therapeutic attitude as the psychologist having a caring mind-set and an appreciation for the patient as an individual human being rather than as a manipulated object. This idea is also still prominent today and is considered to be relevant for successful research outcomes.

Furthering the clinical psychology field

Fifty years after its conception, the Clinical Psychology field was ambiguously defined because of limiting the profession to one setting and because of the lack of standardization of training and teachings. Shakow developed further the clinical psychology field as a profession by specifying goals and functions of the field, training, and by creating relationships with allied professors (p. 211). He suggested having clinical psychology students individually selecting and organizing their coursework and training without any group support and had to be constantly defending and protecting his work. By rejecting definitions that were too narrow, which limited the clinician to just research, but too broad, which would make the field get diluted with other  fields, and from his experience in working in medical psychiatric fields, he formalized what clinical psychologists are to diagnose, research, and do therapy as part of their profession.

Program for training clinical psychologists 

Before 1946, there was only implicit agreement of what a clinical psychologist student should study in order to prepare themselves for practicing clinical psychology because universities were neither offering the same classes nor covering the same materials across the classes.  Internships for getting experience in the field were not standardized, nor were clinical psychology students given a uniform title in which they would be recognized in as they worked as interns.

Shakow's role on the training was to standardize and systematize the training students had to go through as part of his defining what clinical psychologist were to do as part of their profession. He developed a clinical internship-training program model that was inspired from his experience in the mental psychiatric facilities and was to be the model for other institutions to use in the future. From his internship experience and work at the WSH giving him the opportunity to influence more than one hundred psychology interns, who were active participants of the clinical and the research aspects of the professional activities at the hospital, Shakow was able to implement an official standardization of the internship program, where the students would complete certain requirements in a certain order in order for them to become accredited and competent clinical psychologists. At the WSH, he implemented that clinical psychologist students at the end of their training, should be able to diagnose, do research, and perform therapy. The four-year training program stressed the setting up of goals as a rough guide for the students to see the expectations and for them to be aware of what is involved in the program and prepare them for their careers as clinical psychologists. This program was the working document for the Boulder Conference's discussion on how to define the field of clinical psychology.

Schizophrenia research 

While Shakow was at Worcester he began to study schizophrenia. Shakow studied several different ways of measuring deterioration and deficits in abilities to function. He compared verbal and manual reaction times and associations in people with schizophrenia compared to normal subjects. Shakow found that deterioration occurs at the reflexive level, meaning it can be reversed. Deficits are defined as irreversible damage, which is found to occur at the cognitive and perceptual levels as a result of Shakow's research.
Shakow promoted a new view on schizophrenia. By showing that those with schizophrenia were still human and were not untreatable or dangerous allowed for a different kind of care for the mentally ill. Shakow's dissertation The Nature of Deterioration of Schizophrenia was recognized as a classic study of schizophrenia.

Because of his work and contributions to the science and practice in the field of Clinical Psychology, the American Psychological Association established the David Shakow Early Career Award for Distinguished Scientific Contributions to Clinical Psychology, which is an award voted on and given by the Division 12 Board of Directors of the APA, called the Society of Clinical Psychology, to individuals who have received a doctorate within the past seven years who have contributed to the science of clinical psychology, both in science and practice. The award winner receives up to $500 to travel to the year's APA convention.

Awards and recognition 

Shakow eventually moved to NIMH where he developed the laboratory and created special sections to study schizophrenia, childhood development, aging, perception, and even personality. Due to his work he was awarded the Distinguished Scientific Contribution Award and the Distinguished Professional Contribution Award. Over the years, Shakow also completed biographies on Herman Ebbinghaus and Kurt Goldstein for the American Journal of Psychology.

This is a list of the awards, memberships, and recognitions Shakow was awarded with throughout his lifetime, in order of his receiving them:

 Honorary Membership in the Washington Psychoanalytic Society (1955)
 Distinguished Contribution Award, Division of Clinical Psychology, APA (1959)
 Collier Lecturer, University of Rochester (1960)
 Stanley R. Dean Research Award in Schizophrenia (1963)
 Helen Sargent Memorial Award, Menninger Foundation (1965)
 Honorary Fellowship in the American Psychiatric Association (1969)
 Doctor of Science, Honoris Causa, University of Rochester (1971)
 3rd Annual Seymour D. Vestermark Memorial Award (1971)
 National Association of Mental Health Special Recognition Award at the 25th Anniversary of NIMH (1971)
 First Award for Notable Contribution to Psychopathology, Section of Experimental Psychopathology, Division of Clinical Psychology, APA (1971)
 Salmon Medal for Distinguished Service in Psychiatry (1971)
 Honorary Membership in the American Psychoanalytic Association (1976)
 American Psychological Association's (APA) Distinguished Scientific Award (1975) and its Distinguished Professional Contribution Award (1976)
 First Rapaport-Klein Memorial Lecturer (1974) 
 NIH Scientist Emeritus (1974-1975)

Works

Journals on Schizophrenia 

Shakow, D. (1946). The nature of deterioration in schizophrenic conditions" Nervous & Mental Disorders Monograph Series 70, vii - 88.

Other journals

Books 

Shakow, D. (1901). Clinical psychology as science and profession. Chicago: Aldine Pub. Co.
Shakow, D. (1979). Adaption in schizophrenia: the theory of segmental set. New York: John Wiley & Sons Canada, Limited.
Shakow, D. & Rapaport, D. (1964). The influence of Freud on American psychology. Michigan: International Universities Press.

References

1901 births
1981 deaths
20th-century American psychologists
Schizophrenia researchers
Harvard University alumni